Dandot (Punjabi) is a village, union council, and administrative subdivision of Chakwal District in the Punjab Province of Pakistan. It is part of Choa Saidan Shah Tehsil.

Villages in Union Council 
Dandot Union Councils is subdivided into 2 Villages.
 Dandot
 Pidh Punjab

References

Union councils of Chakwal District
Populated places in Chakwal District